Boronia granitica, commonly known as granite boronia, is a plant in the citrus family, Rutaceae and is endemic to a small area of eastern Australia. It is an erect shrub with many branches, compound leaves and pink, four-petalled flowers.

Description
The leaves are compound with between seven and fifteen leaflets. The eight stamens alternate in length with those opposite the sepals slightly longer.

Taxonomy and namingBoronia granitica was first formally described in 1905 by Joseph Maiden and Ernst Betche and the description was published in Proceedings of the Linnean Society of New South Wales from a specimen collected from "the fissures of granite rock".

 Distribution and habitat
Granite boronia grows in open forest, woodland and heath on granite soils. It is found between Stanthorpe in Queensland and Armidale in New South Wales.

ConservationBoronia granitica is classified as "endangered" under the Australian Government Environment Protection and Biodiversity Conservation Act 1999 and as "vulnerable" under the New South Wales Government Biodiversity Conservation Act 2016'', and a recovery plan has been prepared.

References

granitica
Flora of New South Wales
Flora of Queensland
Plants described in 1905
Taxa named by Joseph Maiden
Taxa named by Ernst Betche